Robert Falconer is a Canadian academic.

Robert Falconer is also the name of:
 Bob Falconer, English cricketer
 Robert Falconer (Toronto hotelier), see Spadina Hotel 
Robert Falconer, novel by George MacDonald

See also
 Robert Faulknor, Royal Navy officer
 Robert Faulkner, Canadian footballer